The Falkland Islands Defence Force (FIDF) is the locally maintained volunteer defence unit in the Falkland Islands, a British Overseas Territory. The FIDF works alongside the military units supplied by the United Kingdom to ensure the security of the islands.

History

Origin 
In 1847, Lieutenant Richard Clement Moody, Governor of the Falkland Islands, formed the Falklands' militia force, consisting of two infantry platoons, and a combined mounted and artillery unit. A volunteer unit was reformed in 1854, during the Crimean War, to guard against possible aggression by the Russian Empire.

In 1892, a steamer owned by one of the belligerents involved in the Chilean Civil War docked at Port Stanley. Ostensibly there to carry out repairs to its engines, the presence onboard of 200 armed soldiers was considered a security threat, and Governor Sir Roger Goldsworthy therefore ordered that an armed volunteer force be formed. The first draft of men of the Falkland Islands Volunteer Corps were sworn in at a ceremony at the Falkland Government House, in June 1892.

World War I 

During the First World War, members of the Volunteer Corps were mobilised to man military outposts around the Islands, while 36 Falklanders enlisted in the British armed forces, 10 of whom subsequently lost their lives during the war. In 1919 the Falkland Island Volunteer Corps were stood down and were subsequently renamed as the Falkland Islands Defence Force on 13 December 1920.

During the First World War the Volunteers were issued the General Service Corps cap badge. This was used into the 1930s on dress uniforms.

Inter-war 
In 1931 on the recommendation of Captain C.E.C Ransome Royal Marines visiting the island on HMS Danae the Defence Force adopted Royal Marine Blue Dress Uniforms for ceremonial duties. This style of uniform is still in use today.

World War II 
The FIDF was mobilised again during the Second World War, manning defensive outposts around the Islands. At this time, a mounted rifles unit was raised.

On 27 September 1939, thirty-three men arrived from Argentina in a group called the "Tabaris Highlanders." Gathered from the Anglo-Argentine community, they were supposed to defend the islands from a German attack. Six of these volunteers were rejected on medical and other grounds and returned to Buenos Aires almost immediately. The "commanding officer," a Major Morrough, was one of those rejected. The remainder were enrolled in the Falkland Islands Defence Force, with Ronald Campbell made sergeant as commander and Thomas Dawson Sanderson made corporal. Many were rugby players, including Sanderson, who was president of a rugby club.

The men left the Islands on 8 December 1939, once the immediate danger of attack from German raiders was judged to have receded. During this time the Highlanders dug out gun pits, embankments, and other protection from a possible German naval attack. Twenty-two of them applied from Stanley to join the British Forces.

During the war, around 150 islanders joined the British armed forces, of which 26 were killed in action. In June 1946 a section of the FIDF took part in the Victory Parade in London.

After the end of the war, the presence of Royal Marines as part of the Islands' defence led to the FIDF adopting drill styles. On 28 September 1966, 19 members of an Argentine extremist group staged a symbolic invasion of the Islands by landing a DC-4 on Stanley Racecourse, in one of the first significant hijacking incidents; the extremist group called this action Operation Condor. There, they took four islanders hostage. The FIDF, alongside the Royal Marines, contained the situation and the group surrendered without casualties. Following this, the FIDF was on heightened alert until February 1967.

Falklands War 

On 1 April 1982, alongside the Royal Marines party, the FIDF was mobilised to defend the Islands from the Argentine invasion. Many of its members lived in remote settlements so given the limited notice of its approximately 120 men some 32 turned out. The following day, Sir Rex Hunt ordered them to surrender. The Argentines confiscated all of the FIDF's equipment and declared them to be an illegal organisation. For the duration of the war, some members of the FIDF were kept under house arrest at Fox Bay until the Argentine surrender. The FIDF was reformed in 1983.

Terry Peck, a former member of the Defence Force, spied on Argentine forces in Stanley, then escaped to become a scout for the 3rd Battalion, Parachute Regiment, with which he fought at the Battle of Mount Longdon.

On 28 April 2021, a new motto "Faithful in Defence" was awarded to the FIDF following approval by the Queen.

Personnel 

The Falkland Islands Defence Force meet once a week for training, with various extended training weekends throughout the year. Soldiers of the Falkland Islands Defence Force conduct training patrols with soldiers from the British garrison on the islands as well as acting as "enemy" forces against British soldiers in training exercises.

FIDF soldiers also provide search and rescue and mountain rescue services across the islands. They have been trained by the Royal Navy to operate Oerlikon 20 mm cannons and conduct boarding operations of vessels to fulfill a fisheries protection role for the Falkland Islands Government. As of 2022, the Falkland Islands sovereignty and fisheries patrol vessel is the MV Pharos SG, which assists in policing the exclusive economic zone around the islands as well as around South Georgia and the Sandwich Islands. She  will be replaced in 2023 by the MV Lilibet, named in honour of the late Queen Elizabeth II, and leased to the Falklands Government by Seagull Maritime Limited for fifteen years. Civilian-crewed, the vessel is a Damen Stan 5009 patrol ship with a range of 2,900 nautical miles, a maximum speed of 29.5 knots and a crew of up to 28 persons.

Major Peter Biggs served with the FIDF for 35 years and was the Commanding Officer from 2002 to 2016. Justin McPhee was selected as the next commanding officer of the FIDF in 2018.

In 2019 Major Justin McPhee became the first FIDF Officer to complete the Intermediate Command & Staff Course (Land Reserves) at the UK Defence Academy alongside UK regular and reserve soldiers and international students.

Equipment 
Equipment includes:
 L85A2
 Steyr M9
 L86
 L129A1 Sharpshooter Rifle, a semi-automatic designated marksman's rifle also in use with the British Army.
 Browning Hi-Power pistol
 L7 general purpose machine gun
 Manroy M2HB .50 inch machine gun
 Armed Land Rovers
 Quad Bikes

Former equipment
  Steyr AUG assault rifle - uniquely used by the FIDF among British forces, this was replaced by the L85A2 in 2019.
 Steyr AUG HBAR (Heavy-Barreled Automatic Rifle) light support weapon, this was replaced by the L86 in 2019.

Funding 

The Falkland Islands Defence Force today is funded entirely by the Falkland Islands government and has an annual budget of £400,000.

Organisation 
The FIDF is organised as a light infantry company with additional roles, though, as of 2022, it was reported to be closer to platoon-strength with 40 personnel. It is manned entirely by the local population, based on British Army doctrine, training and operations. New recruits go through a 12-week training program. In an agreement with the British Ministry of Defence, a Royal Marines Warrant Officer Class 2 is seconded to the Force as a Permanent Staff Instructor.

Insignia

Cap badge 

The cap badge is the badge of the FIDF cast in metal. It shows the escutcheon party per bend, with a Sea Lion in the lower half, and the rear end of an old sail ship in the upper half, surrounded by the slogan "Desire the Right". This badge was formerly the Coat of arms of the Falkland Islands from 1925–1948.

Stable belt

Ranks 
The ranks of the FIDF are the same as those used in the British Army/Royal Marines. Rank slides has the badge of Rank and wording on bottom of 'FALKLAND ISLANDS'

Alliances 
 - The Yorkshire Regiment (14th/15th, 19th and 33rd/76th Foot)
 - Royal Marines

See also 
 Military of the Falkland Islands
 Royal Bermuda Regiment
 Cayman Islands Regiment
 Turks and Caicos Islands Regiment
 Royal Gibraltar Regiment
 Royal Montserrat Defence Force
 Royal Hong Kong Regiment (defunct)
 British Army Training and Support Unit Belize
 Overseas military bases of the United Kingdom

Notes

References

External links 

 
 
 

British colonial regiments
Military of the Falkland Islands
Reserve forces of the United Kingdom
Military units and formations established in 1892
Defence Force
Military units and formations of the Falkland Islands in World War II
Military units and formations disestablished in 1982
Military units and formations established in 1983